Nokia C7 Astound is a smart phone capacitive touchscreen device running on Symbian 3 OS. The device is perfect for office use and education. The device came with many features of the modern generation smartphone. It came in three interesting featurable colours- Frosty Metallic, Charcoal Black and Mahogany Brown.

Features
The device is a featurable one with presence of bluetooth v3.0 with support in A2DP and EDR. Unlike previous versions of Nokia Symbian, it has the functionality of GPS, wi-fi 802.11 b/g/n and 3G connectivity. The camera has a primary camera of 8 megapixels with flash and 2x digital zoom. The device is even made smarter with features like dual LED flash and fixed focus. Internet access is via HTML Browser. It has connectivity via USB, GPRS, EDGE, HTML, XHTML, CSS, WML, 3G but lacks Irda. The device supports Java version MIDP 2.1. It lacks QWERTY keyboard and secondary camera. It is similar to Nokia 600. The device has a corning gorilla glass for protection. It has three sensors namely Accelerometer, Proximity and Compass.

Music, Video and radio
The device supports a wide range of music formats like MP3, WMA, AAC, eAAC, eAAC+, AMR-NB and amp; WB, E-AC-3. Moreover, the device supports Active Noise Cancellation with dedicated music. This makes the device a good music player. It has video camera functionality with recording 720p@25fps. After SW update the recording can be made at 720p@30fps. In support with 3gp, it also has a support in DivX, Xvid, MP4, H.264, wmv player. The device has stereo FM Radio with features of FM Recording, RDS and FM Transmitter.

Software
Nokia C7 Astound has supports ava MIDP v2.1. It has Java applications like Web TV, TV Out. Its A-GPS functionality made it a featurable device. It has Ovi Maps 3.0. For office use and education it has Quick Office Document Viewer and Adobe Reader. The document viewer has a support in word, excel, powerpoint and office access. The Adobe Flash Lite is also pre installed in the device for better browsing.

References

External links

Mobile phones introduced in 2011
C7 Astound